Worlds Away is the second studio album by Australian singer Ian Moss, a former member of Cold Chisel. Like its predecessor, the album featured several songs written for him by Don Walker, also from Cold Chisel.
The album was released in October 1991 and peaked in the top 50 in Australia and New Zealand.

Track listing

Charts

References 

1991 albums
Ian Moss albums
Mushroom Records albums